ITC Grand Bharat is a 5-star hotel and golf resort located in Gurgaon, New Delhi Capital Region, India, owned by ITC Hotels. The resort is set along the northern end of the Aravalli Range, and covers an area of 1.2 square km. It is designed in the form of a ‘mandala’, or circle.

History
ITC Hotels is one of the oldest five star hotel chains in India. ITC Limited (formerly known as India Tobacco Company) entered the hotel business in 1975 with the opening of their first hotel, the Chola Sheraton (now rebranded as My Fortune). It has become the second-largest hotel chain in India with over 100 hotels under its helm. ITC hotels is the exclusive franchise of The Luxury Collection in India.

Architecture
ITC Grand Bharat is outlined in the form of a ‘mandala'. Figurative of a celestial diagram, the structure represents completeness and the relation of life with the infinite. The resort is spread over an area of 1.2 square kilometers, and has a 100 luxury suites, 4 presidential villas, 4 dining options, a spa, and, a golf course.

Golf course
The resort has a 27-hole golf course designed by renowned golfer and golf course designer Jack Nicklaus. This golf course is the first of its kind in South Asia, and offers three courses, each with nine holes – The Ridge Course, The Canyon Course, and The Valley Course. Classic Golf and Country Club is a member's club.

References

Golf clubs and courses in India
Hotels in India
Hotels established in 2014
Hotel buildings completed in 2014